The 1993 Weber State Wildcats football team represented Weber State University as a member of the Big Sky Conference during the 1993 NCAA Division I-AA football season. Led by fifth-year head coach Dave Arslanian, the Wildcats compiled an overall record of 7–4 with a mark of 3–4 on conference play, tying for fifth place in the Big Sky. It was the team's third consecutive winning season. In their October 23 matchup against Nevada, the Wildcats upset the NCAA Division I-A Wolfpack, for their second consecutive victory against the former conference foe. Weber State played their home games at Wildcat Stadium in Ogden, Utah.

Schedule

References

Weber State
Weber State Wildcats football seasons
Weber State Wildcats football